Samson Indian Reserve No. 137, also known as Samson No. 137 and Samson 137, and as the Samson Reserve, is an Indian reserve in Maskwacis, Alberta, Canada.

It is inhabited by members of the Samson Cree Nation and was established under the provisions of Treaty 6.

The reserve is located in Central Alberta, near Maskwacis and south of Wetaskiwin.

Demographics
In 2006, Samson IR No.137 had a population of 3,295 residents in 929 dwellings, a 7.4% increase from 2001. By 2009, the Alberta government estimated that the on-reserve population of the nation was 5,550, making the Samson Cree the third largest First Nation in Alberta.

Government
Under the British North America Act, legislative authority over Indian reserves is placed exclusively with the national parliament and specifically the Department of Indian Affairs and Northern Development. The reserve is governed by a band council led by Chief Kurt Buffalo.

See also
List of Indian reserves in Alberta

References

External links
Samson Cree Nation

Indian reserves in Alberta
Cree